Krystyna Pawłowicz (born 14 April 1952 in Wojcieszów) is a Polish jurist and political figure. In the years 2007–2011, Pawłowicz was a Justice of the State Tribunal. She was a member of the Sejm (7th and 8th term) and was part of the National Council of the Judiciary. Pawłowicz is a judge of the Constitutional Tribunal since 5 December 2019. She has taught at the University of Warsaw and the School of Public Administration in Ostrołęka.

She has come to international attention for her negative views on same sex marriage and immigration.  Her controversial statements are considered to be hate speech by many commentators.

Views
She is regarded as belonging to the more Eurosceptic wing of the Law and Justice (PiS) party.

She calls for a “ban [on] 90 percent of today’s abortions”.

In 2013 during a debate of legalising gay marriage she asked “Are sexual ties the only reason why society should finance a barren existence?”

She has accused the German government of deliberately concealing crimes committed by refugees and immigrants.

She accused Jean Claude Juncker of being an alcoholic after his actions during an audience with the Pope.

She has called George Soros the "most dangerous man in the world" on Radio Maryja, a Catholic broadcaster. She said his foundations "finance anti-Christian and anti-national activities."

References

1952 births
Law and Justice politicians
Living people
Members of the Polish Sejm 2011–2015
Polish women lawyers
20th-century Polish lawyers
21st-century Polish lawyers
21st-century Polish politicians
People from Złotoryja County
University of Warsaw alumni
20th-century women lawyers
21st-century women lawyers
20th-century Polish women